Lamoine State Park is a public recreation area occupying  on the shore of Frenchman's Bay in the town of Lamoine, Maine. The state park offers broad views of the mountains on Mount Desert Island, the narrow Eastern Bay portion of Frenchman Bay, and Lamoine's working waterfront. It is managed by the Maine Department of Agriculture, Conservation and Forestry.

History
In the early years of the 20th century, the waterfront where the park stands was the site of a U.S. Navy coaling station. The facility opened in 1902 and ceased operations by 1912 when changing technology made coal-burning warships and their fueling stations obsolete. The state of Maine took possession of the property in 1949, developing it into a state park during the 1950s.

Activities and amenities
The park offers a seasonal, 62-site campground, fishing, picnicking, kayaking, boat launch, and cross-country skiing.

References

External links

Lamoine State Park Department of Agriculture, Conservation and Forestry
Lamoine State Park Brochure Department of Agriculture, Conservation and Forestry

Protected areas of Hancock County, Maine
State parks of Maine
Mount Desert Island
Campgrounds in Maine
 United States